Meghan Musnicki (born February 5, 1983 in Naples, New York) is an American representative rower. She is a five time world champion and twice Olympic champion. She has competed at three Olympics twice winning gold in the women's eight at the London 2012 and Rio 2016. She has represented at World Rowing Championships six times, all in the W8+, winning gold five times and bronze on one occasion. 

She attended Naples Central School District in Naples, NY, and was a guest speaker at the Naples Central School Graduation in 2013, the year after she won her first Olympic gold medal.

Musnicki is a 2005 graduate of Ithaca College.

Musnicki qualified to represent the United States at the 2020 Summer Olympics. She rowed in the seven seat of the US women's eight which finished in overall fourth place.

At the Henley Royal Regatta in 2022 Musnicki teamed up with Australian Olympian Jessica Morrison and went through to win the final of the Hambleden Pairs Challenge Cup over the British crew racing as Leander.

References

External links
Meghan Musnicki at USRowing

1983 births
Living people
American female rowers
Rowers at the 2012 Summer Olympics
Rowers at the 2016 Summer Olympics
Rowers at the 2020 Summer Olympics
Olympic gold medalists for the United States in rowing
Medalists at the 2012 Summer Olympics
Medalists at the 2016 Summer Olympics
People from Naples, New York
World Rowing Championships medalists for the United States